Nipponosynuchus is a genus of ground beetles in the family Carabidae. This genus has a single species, Nipponosynuchus abnormalis. It is found in Japan.

References

Platyninae